The list of ship launches in the 1630s includes a chronological list of some ships launched from 1630 to 1639.

References 

1630s ships
Lists of ship launches
17th century-related lists